Port Plaza Mall (later known as Washington Commons) was an urban area shopping mall/multi-use facility located in downtown Green Bay, Wisconsin.  The mall opened on August 10, 1977, and featured 3 anchor stores over the years, with JCPenney and H.C. Prange open at its launch and Boston Store added by 1982.  The mall would go into a state of decline in the late 1990s and 2000s, leading up to its closure on February 27, 2006.  The mall property was razed during the 1st half of 2012 as part of a redevelopment project; the headquarters of Schreiber Foods now stands on the main mall footprint.

Timeline

1970s and 1980s
After many years of planning by city leaders, ground was broken for Port Plaza Mall in 1975. The mall opened for business on August 10, 1977, under the ownership and management of Chicago-based Mansur & Associates. JCPenney on the East end and a previously existing (since 1927) 300,000 sq ft. H.C. Prange store on the West end. A noted feature of the mall was a four-faced clock tower, whose bell and clock mechanisms came from the Montgomery County Courthouse in Winona, Mississippi.

Boston Store. Metropolitan Life Insurance Co. purchased the mall property in 1986. Two years later, in 1988, Port Plaza underwent renovation that included the addition of neon light fixtures, new floor tiling, and fountains at center court.

1990s and 2000s
The first major anchor change for Port Plaza came in the summer of 1992 when H.C. Prange was acquired by Younkers and subsequently renamed.  In 1997, Whitehall Funds purchased Port Plaza and 9 other malls from Metropolitan Life, and named Johnstown, Pennsylvania-based Zamias Services, Inc. to manage Port Plaza (Zamias would be removed as manager in February 2001).  By this time, however, the mall was in the midst of a decline as shoppers lost favor with the mall and its downtown location and preferred stores and malls in outlying locations such as Bay Park Square in suburban Ashwaubenon.  The mall would lose one of its three anchors in 2000 when Boston Store was merged with the same company that owned Younkers.

In 2001, the mall was acquired by Development Associates, who planned to turn the mall into a mixed-use facility with both retail and office space.  The company would rechristen the mall Washington Commons in recognition of Washington Street's reconnection through the former food court, which was relocated to the former fountain area in center court. (A 2nd level skywalk would connect Younkers to the mall.)  However, the exodus of major tenants would continue, with McDonald's and Osco Drug leaving the mall in 2002, followed by Payless ShoeSource in 2003, and LensCrafters, Champs Sports, and Bath & Body Works in 2004.  Though Washington Commons would attract the University of Wisconsin-Green Bay, who opened a satellite campus and offices in part of the former Boston Store court in 2004, the mall would receive two big blows in the closures of its last two anchors, Younkers and JCPenney, who both left for newer Ashwaubenon facilities in 2004 and 2005, respectively.

Following JCPenney's departure, plans were announced for APAC Customer Services to move its offices to the former Penneys space, but those plans fell through when a deal could not be reached.  APAC would instead reach a deal with the City of Green Bay and BayLake Bank to move to the former Boston Store location, where BayLake Bank was developing a branch and other office space.  Development Associates would take the issue to court, citing conflict of interest by the City and BayLake Bank (which happened to be the mall's lender).  Though the parties would eventually reach an out-of-court settlement, the cost of the suit would leave Development Associates in debt.

By February 20, 2006, with the mall facing foreclosure by BayLake Bank and electrical services about to be disconnected, mall ownership notified its last six tenants that they would have to vacate the mall within 7 days (by February 27). The city gained ownership of the mall property as part of the settlement with Development Associates, and the property was put up for sale with an $8 million price tag.

Post-closure and redevelopment
From February 27, 2006 until its razing, the Port Plaza Mall/Washington Commons property would remain vacant and closed to the general public, though janitorial and security services would be provided in case of potential development and inspection.  The mall's clock tower was removed in June 2010 after being repurchased by its former owners in Winona, Mississippi.

Several proposals to redevelop the mall property would be announced in the years after the mall's closure, among them a May 2008 plan by Middleton, Wisconsin-based T. Wall Properties that featured an 8-to-10-story office building with ground-floor stores and restaurants and re-establishment of the original pre-mall street grid.  An attempt that year to obtain federal stimulus funds for redevelopment of the site was turned down.  In 2010, however, the city received enough interest in the property to seek $1 million in urban redevelopment funds to be put towards both the mall's demolition and the reconnection of Adams Street through the mall's former center court.  The funding was part of an appropriations bill approved by the U.S. House of Representatives on July 29, 2010 but went nowhere in the Senate afterwards, especially with a new Congress taking over in 2011 that was generally against such earmarks (including Green Bay's new representative in Congress, Reid Ribble, who unseated funding supporter Steve Kagen in the 2010 general election).

A more definitive plan came on June 7, 2011, when Green Bay-based Schreiber Foods announced plans to demolish the main mall property, the former JCPenney anchor location (which had never been redeveloped since its closure), and an adjacent Days Inn and build a new $50 million corporate headquarters and technology center on the site.  TIF funding would be transferred to the project in July 2011.  The tearing down of the mall property began with recycling of materials in July 2011, followed by the demolition of the Days Inn the following fall, and the demolition of the remainder of the mall during the first half of 2012.  The new limestone-and-glass headquarters building, which opened in June 2014, consolidated Schreiber's Green Bay operations into one location (it was formerly spread out among 6 leased offices throughout the downtown core); it also features green space and a new east–west street to connect Washington and Adams Streets.

Two of the mall's three anchor store locations saw a quicker fate then the remainder of the mall:  BayLake Bank and APAC Customer Services moved into the refurbished Boston Store site in 2006, a building now known as BayLake City Center.  In mid-2007, demolition began on the former Younkers building (and the skyway that connected it to the mall) to make way for several mixed use developments, among them a new home for the Children's Museum of Green Bay that opened in 2012 (the Children's Museum had been a Washington Commons tenant until 2005).

In December 2022, the clock tower from the Port Plaza Mall has been reconstructed on Front Street in downtown Winona, Mississippi, where the clock's inner mechanisms and bell originated.

References

External links
Labelscar listing for Port Plaza Mall/Washington Commons
From Flickr: Green Bay News-Chronicle coverage of Port Plaza's August 1977 opening
Pictures of Port Plaza Mall's interior and exterior in 2009.
Port Plaza Mall/Washington Commons "memory board" on Facebook

Shopping malls established in 1977
2006 disestablishments in Wisconsin
Shopping malls in Wisconsin
Demolished shopping malls in the United States
Buildings and structures in Green Bay, Wisconsin
1977 establishments in Wisconsin
Victor Gruen buildings